Kodu may refer to:

 Kodu, Kodu Game Lab - visual programming tool
 Lat-Kodu (reigned 1750–1755) and Baka Kodu (reigned 1845–1847) were rulers of the Wolof Empire

See also
Kudu - a type of Antelope